The Roland D-70 is a 76 note Super LA synthesizer produced in Japan in 1990. it featured a 240 x 64 pixel backlit LCD display and competed with the likes of the Korg M1 and T-series workstations and Yamaha SY77 workstation, although the D-70 was not itself a workstation because it lacked a sequencer. The D-70 can also split or layer the four tones that constitute a patch and has D-50 style TVF filters. It has onboard drums sounds and is 6-part multi timbral (5 synth parts and one drum part). It has four left control faders that can be assigned in real time to the following  paramemeters: Level, Pan, Tuning, Cutoff, Resonance, Attack, and Release. It has three modes of play: Mono, Polyphonic, Split. Despite being anticipated as a "Super D-50", it is in fact a different machine, a prototype of very successful JV series full-sample playback synths (ROMplers). It's very similar to JV-90, though has fewer quality samples and fewer editing capabilities.

Expandability
The D-70 also can read U220 series PCM cards, and has two PCM card slots on the rear of the unit, and also a RAM slot.

Typical Sounds
Typical sounds include: Rhodes, Strings, Pianos, Organ patches and also synth sounds such as: Ghosties, Prologue and SpaceDream.

Effects
There are six reverbs (Room 1-3, Hall 1 & 2 and Gated), delay and cross-delay, and one effect from Chorus 1 & 2, FB-Chorus, Flanger and Short Delay in another effect. There are just three reverb / delay parameters: reverb/delay time and level and delay feedback. Chorus / flanger allows you to set level, delay, rate, depth and feedback.

See also 
 Roland D-05 
 Roland D-50

References

External links
 http://www.houseofsynth.com/hos-downloads/manuals/Roland/Roland-Owners-Manuals/Roland-D-70-Owners-Manual.pdf

D
MIDI instruments
Polyphonic synthesizers
Digital synthesizers
Musical instruments invented in the 1980s